Conegliano (Venetian: Conejan) is a town and comune of the Veneto region, Italy, in the province of Treviso, about  north by rail from the town of Treviso. The population of the city is of  people. The remains of a 10th-century castle are situated on a hill that dominates the town. Formerly belonging to the Bishop of Vittorio Veneto, what remains is a bell tower, which now houses a small museum, and outer walls.

On 7 July 2019, Le Colline del Prosecco di Conegliano e Valdobbiadene was inscribed as a UNESCO World Heritage Site.

Industry
Conegliano is noted for its wine, chiefly the dry white Prosecco (made from the glera grape) which comes in three varieties: tranquillo (still), frizzante (slightly sparkling) and spumante (sparkling). It is also home to Italy's oldest and most prestigious wine school called Scuola Enologica.

It is also home to the Istituto Sperimentale per la Viticoltura where several Italian grape varieties have been bred, including Albarossa, Vega and Valentino nero. Additionally, viticulturalists at the institute have helped save many native Italian grape varieties from extinction, such as the Valpolicella grape Bigolona.

There is also a great industrial tradition, especially specialized in home appliances.

Colli di Conegliano DOC

The hills around Conegliano are home to the Denominazione di origine controllata e garantita (DOCG) zone of Colli di Conegliano. There both red and white Italian wines are produced at a variety of sweetness levels from dry to sweet passito dessert wines. Grapes destined for DOC wine production must be harvested to a yield no greater than 12 tonnes/hectare. The finished wine must attain a minimum alcohol level of 12% for the red wines and 10.5% for the whites in order to be labelled with the Colli di Conegliano DOC designation.

The red DOC wines are made Merlot (10-40%), Cabernet Sauvignon, Cabernet Franc and Marzemino (at least 10% of each with no maximum for the last three varieties) and up 10% of Incrocio Manzoni 2.15. The wine is required to be aged at least two years in barrel prior to being released. A sweet red passito labeled as Refrontolo is made from at least 95% Marzemino with up 5% of other local non-aromatic varieties permitted to round out the blend.

The dry white of the DOC is made from at least 30% Manzoni bianco with between 30-70% collectively of Pinot blanc and Chardonnay and up to 10% total of Sauvignon blanc and Riesling Renano. The passito style Torchiato di Fregona can be made in both a dry and sweet style from at least 30% each of Glera and Verdiso, a minimum 25% of Boschera and up to 15% of non-aromatic varieties like Marzemina bianca and Bianchetta Trevigiana. This wine is required to age at least 13 months prior to being release.

Culture

Every June, a special chess or 'dama' game where the pieces are represented by actual real people—known as the Dama Castellana—is performed in the historical center. This event is not the continuation of a secular tradition, but has been introduced only a few years ago, still managed to become a traditional event calendar coneglianese.

Conegliano was the birthplace of the painters Cima da Conegliano, a fine altar-piece by whom is in the cathedral (dating to 1492), and Francesco Beccaruzzi, as well as the composer and conductor at the Cincinnati Conservatory, Pier Adolfo Tirindelli.

The town has one association football team called Conegliano who currently play in the Promozione, the sixth tier of Italian football.

People
Francesco Beccaruzzi, painter
Ferruccio Benini, actor.
Ugo Cerletti, a neurologist who discovered the method of electroconvulsive therapy in psychiatry.
Giambattista Cima, Renaissance painter.
Paolo De Coppi, scientist.
Alessandro Del Piero, World Cup-winning footballer.
Marco Donadel,  football midfielder.
Maurizio Zanetti, scientist immunologist
Gino Girolamo Fanno, engineer.
Marco Fanno, economist.
Pier Paolo Pasolini, poet.
Maurizio Sacconi, politician.
Alberto Rapisarda, illustrator.
Tullio De Rosa, enologist and novelist.
Stefano Curtarolo, materials scientist.
Bruna Pegoraro Brylawski, molecular biologist.

Transport
 Conegliano railway station

Taxis are often located at the railway station to transport train riders to their final destination in Conegliano.

International relations

Twin towns - sister cities

Conegliano is twinned with:

 Garibaldi in Brazil
Lismore in New South Wales, Australia

Photo gallery

References
Conegliano Official Website
Exhibition Official Website

Notes

Cities and towns in Veneto
World Heritage Sites in Italy